The Ebor Lectures are an annual series of lectures in the United Kingdom which aim to draw together theology and public life, considering the role of faith in "public issues such as politics, economics, contemporary culture and spirituality." The first series began in 2006–2007 with the theme of Liberating Text? Revelation, Identity and Public Life and transcripts for this series have been published as a book entitled Liberating Texts?. The 2007–2008 series had the theme of Globalisation and Identity.

Organisers
The Ebor Lectures are jointly organised by the following groups and are held either at York Minster or at York St John University in York, northern England.

 York Minster
 York St John University
 The York Institute for Community Theology
 The Carmelites
 The Churches Regional Commission for Yorkshire and the Humber

History

2006–2007 Series

Liberating Text? Revelation, Identity and Public Life
Uncovering the Purposes of God
 The Most. Revd. and Rt. Hon. Dr John Sentamu - Archbishop of York
God and our Public Life: A Scriptural Wisdom
 Prof. David Ford - Regius Professor of Divinity, University of Cambridge
Text and Context: Making Sense of Islam in the Modern World
 Dr Ataullah Siddiqui - Director, Markfield Institute of Higher Education
Sacred Text and the Transcendence of Tradition: The Bible in a Pluralist Society
 The Revd. Professor Francis Young - Emeritus Professor, University of Birmingham
The Bible and Modern Israel
 Rabbi Professor Dan Cohn-Sherbok - Professor of Judaism, University of Wales, Lampeter
Religious Traditions in the Context of a Liberal Democracy
 The Rt. Hon. The Baroness Williams of Crosby

2007–2008 Series

Globalisation and Identity
Christian Identity amidst Global Contradictions: A Christian Humanist Perspective
 Professor John de Gruchy - University of Cape Town
William Blake 250 years on - Prophet for our Time?
 Professor Christopher Rowland - University of Oxford
Patterns of Religion in Modern Europe: A Global Perspective
 Professor Grace Davie - University of Exeter
Poverty and Prophets: Faith based Agencies and Social Justice
 Dr Daleep Mukarji - Director, Christian Aid
Globalisation and Muslim Identity in Europe
 Professor Tariq Ramadan - President, European Muslim Network/University of Oxford
Apocalypse Now – Global Equity and Sustainable Living, the Preconditions for Human Survival
 The Rt. Hon. Clare Short MP

2008–2009 Series

The Challenge of Climate Change Eco-crisis, Sustainable Living and the Future of the Planet
Hope, Hype and Honesty Reporting Global Change: A Still Point on a Turning Planet
Mr Martin Redfern - Senior Producer, BBC Radio Science Unit
Silence in Heaven: Reading Climate Change Through the Book of Revelation
Professor Tim Gorringe - Professor of Theological Ethics, University of Exeter
Creation, Ecological Crisis and the Global Poor
Dr Elaine Storkey - President, Tearfund
Renewing the Face of the Earth: Human Responsibility and the Environment
The Most Rev & Rt Hon Dr Rowan Williams - Archbishop of Canterbury
Disturbing the Present  
Mr John Sauven - Executive Director, Greenpeace UK,                    
‘Consider the lilies of the field’: How Luke’s Gospel Could Save the Planet
Professor Mary Grey - Professor Emerita, University of Wales, Lampeter 
The Science of Climate Change      
Professor Nicholas Owens - Director, British Antarctic Survey

2017 Series 

Ruth Hunt, Chief Executive of Stonewall, "Here I am Lord". The Place for LGBT people in the modern Christian Movement, 22 February 2017; York Minster, 7.00pm

Dr Timothy Winter, Shaykh Lecturer in Islamic Studies at the University of Cambridge, Religion, Radicalism and Contemporary Politics, 29 March 2017; Temple Hall, York St John University, 7.00pm

Tim Shipman, Political Editor of The Sunday Times, The Journey through Brexit, 26 April; York Minster, 7.00pm

Dr Casey Strine, Lecturer in Eastern History and Literature at University of Sheffield, What refugees can teach others about the Bible, 24 May 2017; Temple Hall, York St John University, 7.00pm

Professor Eamon Duffy, FBA, Emeritus Professor of the History of Christianity, Writing the Reformation: Fiction and Faction, 5 July 2017; York Minster, 7.00pm

Ruth Gledhill, Editor of Christian Today; former Religious Affairs Correspondent for The Times, 'This Virtual Pilgrimage: How our temporal journey is leading us in a new reformation', 11 October 2017; Temple Hall, York St John University, 7.00pm

References

2006 establishments in England
Recurring events established in 2006
Lecture series
Culture in York
Christianity and environmentalism